Liselotte Malkowsky (9 October 1913 – 16 February 1965) was a German singer, actress, and cabaret artist.

Malkowsky appeared in 1950s German films as a cabaret singer, and released a number of records, including a 1949 recording of Charles Trenet's song "La Mer" which enjoyed a certain popularity in Germany.

Selected filmography 
  The Allure of Danger (1950)
  A Heidelberg Romance (1951)
  The Thief of Bagdad (1952)
 Homesick for You (1952)
 On the Reeperbahn at Half Past Midnight (1954)
  Sacred Lie (1954)
 The Big Star Parade (1954)

Selected discography 
 Unter 1000 Laternen
 Das Herz von St. Pauli
 Matrosen Brauchen Liebe
In der Bar "Zum gold'nen Anker" (Ja so ist das mit der Liebe)

References

External links 
 
 Liselotte Malkowsky (discography) at Discogs
 Liselotte Malkowsky at Find a Grave
 Liselotte Malkowsky (album discography) at AllMusic

German cabaret performers
German actresses
20th-century German women singers

1913 births
1965 deaths